The French School of Seoul (LFS) is a French international school in Seorae Village, a community in Banpo-dong, Seocho-gu, Seoul, South Korea. It includes kindergarten through secondary school education, which includes high school.

As of 2012, 58% of the students were French, 15% were South Korean, and 27% from 23 other countries.

History
The school was previously in Hannam-dong, Yongsan-gu, but moved to Seorae Village in 1985. Park Seong-jung, the mayor of Seocho-gu as of 2009, stated that therefore a French community was established in Seorae Village because of the school.

References

Further reading
 Jean-Marc Thiébaud, La présence française en Corée de la fin du XVIIIe à nos jours, L'Harmattan, 2005, p. 106.

External links

 Seoul French School
 Seoul French School 
 Seoul French School (Archive)
 Lycee Francais de Seoul - International School Information, Government of South Korea

French international schools in South Korea
International schools in Seoul
Buildings and structures in Seocho District